Bates State Park is a  state park in Grant County, Oregon, USA, near Prairie City. The park includes hiking trails, primitive RV and tent campsites, and a day use area for hikers and bicyclists.

History
The park is located on the Middle Fork John Day River, on the site of a lumber mill that closed in 1975. The company town for the mill, Bates, formerly had a population of about 400 on the site, but when the mill closed, the town slowly depopulated. The mill pond, one of the few remaining landmarks from the lumber mill era, is a central feature of the new park.

In 2008, the Oregon Parks and Recreation Department purchased the property from the county for $407,000 and spent another $900,000 in preparing the park for its opening in September 2011. Several matching grants were used to continue to develop and maintain the park.

Features
The park contains 28 primitive campsites for tents and RVs. In addition, there is a day use area for hikers and bicyclists, who use the area as part of the TransAmerica bicycle trail. The day use area contains locations for picnicking and several miles of hiking trails are available. Interpretive panels describing the history of the town and the mill era are on display. The park is open from May to October.

See also
 List of Oregon state parks

References

External links
 

Parks in Grant County, Oregon
State parks of Oregon
Protected areas established in 2011
2011 establishments in Oregon